The Fiat A.14 was an Italian 12-cylinder, liquid-cooled, V aero engine of World War I.  The A.14 held the distinction at the end of World War I of being the largest and most powerful aircraft engine in the world.  First produced in 1917, 500 were built by the end of the war.

Applications
Fiat BR.1
Macchi M.19
SIA.9

Specifications (Fiat A.14)

See also

References

A.14
1910s aircraft piston engines